The E series is a system of preferred numbers (also called preferred values) derived for use in electronic components. It consists of the E3, E6, E12, E24, E48, E96 and E192 series, where the number after the 'E' designates the quantity of logarithmic value "steps" per decade. Although it is theoretically possible to produce components of any value, in practice the need for inventory simplification has led the industry to settle on the E series for resistors, capacitors, inductors, and zener diodes.  Other types of electrical components are either specified by the Renard series (for example fuses) or are defined in relevant product standards (for example IEC 60228 for wires).

History
During the Golden Age of Radio (1920s to 1950s), numerous companies manufactured AM radio receivers for consumer use.  In the early years, many components were not standardized between radio manufacturers.  The capacitance values of capacitors (previously called condensers) and resistance values for resistors were different than today.

In 1924, the Radio Manufacturers Association (RMA) was formed by 50 radio manufacturers in Chicago to license and share patents. Over time, this group created some of the earliest standards for electronics components.  In 1936, the RMA adopted a preferred number system for the resistance values of fixed composition resistors. Over time, resistor manufacturers migrated from older resistance values to the 1936 resistance value standard.  

American and British military production during World War II was a major influence for establishing common standards across many industries, especially in electronics, where it was essential to produce large quantities of standardized electronic parts very quickly for wireless communication and Radar devices.  Later, the mid-20th century baby boom and the invention of the transistor kicked off demand for consumer electronics goods during the 1950s.  As transistor radio production migrated towards Japan during the late-1950s, it was critical for the electronic industry to have international standards.  

As worked on by the RMA, the International Electrotechnical Commission (IEC) began work on an international standard in 1948. The first version of this IEC Publication 63 (IEC 63) was released in 1952. Later, IEC 63 was revised, amended, and renamed into the current version known as IEC 60063:2015.

IEC 60063 release history:
 IEC 63:1952 (aka IEC 60063:1952), first edition, published 1952-01-01.
 IEC 63:1963 (aka IEC 60063:1963), second edition, published 1963-01-01.
 IEC 63:1967/AMD1:1967 (aka IEC 60063:1967/AMD1:1967), first amendment of second edition, published 1967.
 IEC 63:1977/AMD2:1977 (aka IEC 60063:1977/AMD2:1977), second amendment of second edition, published 1977.
 IEC 60063:2015, third edition, published 2015-03-27.

Overview
The E series of preferred numbers was chosen such that when a component is manufactured it will end up in a range of roughly equally spaced values (geometric progression) on a logarithmic scale. Each E series subdivides each decade magnitude into steps of 3, 6, 12, 24, 48, 96, 192 values. Subdivisions of E3 to E192 ensure the maximum error will be divided in the order of 40%, 20%, 10%, 5%, 2%, 1%, 0.5%. Also, the E192 series is used for 0.25% and 0.1% tolerance resistors.

Historically, the E series is split into two major groupings:
 E3, E6, E12, E24 — E3, E6, E12 are subsets of E24. Values in this group are rounded to 2 significant figures.
 E48, E96, E192 – E48 and E96 are subsets of E192. Values in this group are rounded to 3 significant figures.

Since the electronic component industry established component values before standards discussions in the late-1940s, they decided that it wasn't practical to change the former established values.  These older values were used to create the E6, E12, E24 series standard that was accepted in Paris in 1950 then published as IEC 63 in 1952.  Eight of the E24 values do not match the following formula.

The formula for each value is determined by the n-th root:

For E3 to E24, the values are rounded to 2 significant figures. For unknown historical reasons, eight older industry values (shown in bold) are different from the calculated values.

The eight official E24 values shown in bold do not exist in the E48, E96, E192 series.

For E48 to E192, the values are rounded to 3 significant figures.

 To calculate the E48 series:  is 48, then  is incremented from 0 to 47 through the formula.
 To calculate the E96 series:  is 96, then  is incremented from 0 to 95 through the formula.
 To calculate the E192 series:  is 192, then  is incremented from 0 to 191 through the formula, with one exception where 9.20 is official instead of calculated 9.19.

E3
The calculated constant tangential tolerance for this series gives ( − 1) ÷ ( + 1) = 36.60%, approximately. While the standard only specifies a tolerance greater than 20%, other sources indicate 40% or 50%. Currently, most electrolytic capacitors are manufactured with values in the E6 or E12 series, thus E3 series is mostly obsolete.

E24 vs. E48, E96, E192
This allows easier purchasing migration between different tolerance parts. This type of combination is noted on resistor datasheets and webpages as "E96 + E24" and "E192 + E24".

Comparison of E24 vs. E48 values
matching – 1.00, 1.10, 7.50
missing – 1.20, 1.30, 1.50, 1.60, 1.80, 2.00, 2.20, 2.40, 2.70, 3.00, 3.30, 3.60, 3.90, 4.30, 4.70, 5.10, 5.60, 6.20, 6.80, 8.20, 9.10
Comparison of E24 vs. E96 values
matching – 1.00, 1.10, 1.30, 1.50, 2.00, 7.50
missing – 1.20, 1.60, 1.80, 2.20, 2.40, 2.70, 3.00, 3.30, 3.60, 3.90, 4.30, 4.70, 5.10, 5.60, 6.20, 6.80, 8.20, 9.10.
Comparison of E24 vs. E192 values
matching – 1.00, 1.10, 1.20, 1.30, 1.50, 1.60, 1.80, 2.00, 2.40, 4.70, 7.50
missing – 2.20, 2.70, 3.00, 3.30, 3.60, 3.90, 4.30, 5.10, 5.60, 6.20, 6.80, 8.20, 9.10

Examples
If a manufacturer sold resistors with all values in a range of 1 ohm to 10 megaohms, the available resistance values for E3 through E12 would be:

If a manufacturer sold capacitors with all values in a range of 1 pF to 10,000 μF, the available capacitance values for E3 and E6 would be:

Lists

List of values for each E series:

E3 values
 (40% tolerance)
 1.0, 2.2, 4.7
E6 values
 (20% tolerance)
 1.0, 1.5, 2.2, 3.3, 4.7, 6.8
E12 values
 (10% tolerance)
 1.0, 1.2, 1.5, 1.8, 2.2, 2.7, 3.3, 3.9, 4.7, 5.6, 6.8, 8.2
E24 values
 (5% tolerance)
 1.0, 1.1, 1.2, 1.3, 1.5, 1.6, 1.8, 2.0, 2.2, 2.4, 2.7, 3.0, 3.3, 3.6, 3.9, 4.3, 4.7, 5.1, 5.6, 6.2, 6.8, 7.5, 8.2, 9.1
E48 values
 (2% tolerance)
 1.00, 1.05, 1.10, 1.15, 1.21, 1.27, 1.33, 1.40, 1.47, 1.54, 1.62, 1.69, 1.78, 1.87, 1.96, 2.05, 2.15, 2.26, 2.37, 2.49, 2.61, 2.74, 2.87, 3.01, 3.16, 3.32, 3.48, 3.65, 3.83, 4.02, 4.22, 4.42, 4.64, 4.87, 5.11, 5.36, 5.62, 5.90, 6.19, 6.49, 6.81, 7.15, 7.50, 7.87, 8.25, 8.66, 9.09, 9.53
E96 values
 (1% tolerance)
 1.00, 1.02, 1.05, 1.07, 1.10, 1.13, 1.15, 1.18, 1.21, 1.24, 1.27, 1.30, 1.33, 1.37, 1.40, 1.43, 1.47, 1.50, 1.54, 1.58, 1.62, 1.65, 1.69, 1.74, 1.78, 1.82, 1.87, 1.91, 1.96, 2.00, 2.05, 2.10, 2.15, 2.21, 2.26, 2.32, 2.37, 2.43, 2.49, 2.55, 2.61, 2.67, 2.74, 2.80, 2.87, 2.94, 3.01, 3.09, 3.16, 3.24, 3.32, 3.40, 3.48, 3.57, 3.65, 3.74, 3.83, 3.92, 4.02, 4.12, 4.22, 4.32, 4.42, 4.53, 4.64, 4.75, 4.87, 4.99, 5.11, 5.23, 5.36, 5.49, 5.62, 5.76, 5.90, 6.04, 6.19, 6.34, 6.49, 6.65, 6.81, 6.98, 7.15, 7.32, 7.50, 7.68, 7.87, 8.06, 8.25, 8.45, 8.66, 8.87, 9.09, 9.31, 9.53, 9.76
E192 values
 (0.5% and lower tolerance)
 1.00, 1.01, 1.02, 1.04, 1.05, 1.06, 1.07, 1.09, 1.10, 1.11, 1.13, 1.14, 1.15, 1.17, 1.18, 1.20, 1.21, 1.23, 1.24, 1.26, 1.27, 1.29, 1.30, 1.32, 1.33, 1.35, 1.37, 1.38, 1.40, 1.42, 1.43, 1.45, 1.47, 1.49, 1.50, 1.52, 1.54, 1.56, 1.58, 1.60, 1.62, 1.64, 1.65, 1.67, 1.69, 1.72, 1.74, 1.76, 1.78, 1.80, 1.82, 1.84, 1.87, 1.89, 1.91, 1.93, 1.96, 1.98, 2.00, 2.03, 2.05, 2.08, 2.10, 2.13, 2.15, 2.18, 2.21, 2.23, 2.26, 2.29, 2.32, 2.34, 2.37, 2.40, 2.43, 2.46, 2.49, 2.52, 2.55, 2.58, 2.61, 2.64, 2.67, 2.71, 2.74, 2.77, 2.80, 2.84, 2.87, 2.91, 2.94, 2.98, 3.01, 3.05, 3.09, 3.12, 3.16, 3.20, 3.24, 3.28, 3.32, 3.36, 3.40, 3.44, 3.48, 3.52, 3.57, 3.61, 3.65, 3.70, 3.74, 3.79, 3.83, 3.88, 3.92, 3.97, 4.02, 4.07, 4.12, 4.17, 4.22, 4.27, 4.32, 4.37, 4.42, 4.48, 4.53, 4.59, 4.64, 4.70, 4.75, 4.81, 4.87, 4.93, 4.99, 5.05, 5.11, 5.17, 5.23, 5.30, 5.36, 5.42, 5.49, 5.56, 5.62, 5.69, 5.76, 5.83, 5.90, 5.97, 6.04, 6.12, 6.19, 6.26, 6.34, 6.42, 6.49, 6.57, 6.65, 6.73, 6.81, 6.90, 6.98, 7.06, 7.15, 7.23, 7.32, 7.41, 7.50, 7.59, 7.68, 7.77, 7.87, 7.96, 8.06, 8.16, 8.25, 8.35, 8.45, 8.56, 8.66, 8.76, 8.87, 8.98, 9.09, 9.20, 9.31, 9.42, 9.53, 9.65, 9.76, 9.88

Table

See also

 Electronic color code – color-code used to indicate the values of axial electronic components, such as resistors, capacitors, inductors, diodes (also see IEC 60062). 
 Geometric progression
 Preferred number
 Renard series – used for current rating of electric fuses
 Three-character marking code for resistors – for (E48/)E96 values (see EIA-96 and IEC 60062:2016)
 Two-character marking code for capacitors – for (E3/E6/E12/)E24 values (see ANSI/EIA-198-D:1991, ANSI/EIA-198-1-E:1998, ANSI/EIA-198-1-F:2002 and IEC 60062:2016/AMD1:2019)

Notes

References

External links

 Calculate the closest component value to any E-series with an Excel User Defined Function.
 Calculate standard resistor values in Excel – EDN magazine
Printable E series tables
 E6 to E96 Table – Servenger
 E3 to E192 Table – Vishay
 E6 to E192 Table – Analog Services

Numbers
Industrial design
Logarithmic scales of measurement

es:Números_preferentes#Condensadores_y_resistencias